The Network Aging Research (NAR) / Netzwerk AlternsfoRschung of the Heidelberg University is a research network on the topic of aging in the Rhein-Neckar-Region, Germany. The NAR was founded on 1 June 2006, and inaugurated on 19 July 2007. It succeeds the “Deutsches Zentrum fuer Alternsforschung" (DZFA), which closed on 31 December 2005 due to a lack of funding from the federal and state governments. The NAR is a permanent research network, financed by the Ministry of Science, Research and Arts of Baden-Württemberg.

Cooperation Partners 
The NAR officially cooperates with the following institutions: Heidelberg University, consisting of the two medical faculties in Mannheim and Heidelberg; the German Cancer Research Center DKFZ, the University of Mannheim, and the Central Institute of Mental Health ZI, Mannheim.

The goal of the NAR is to utilize existing networks, strengthen ties between cooperating institutions, and bring together varied disciplines that focus on aging.

Organisation 
The Network Aging Research is led by the board of directors, consisting of a spokesperson for each research area:
 Konrad Beyreuther (Founding Director)
 Hermann Brenner (Associate Director)
 Hans-Werner Wahl (Associate Director)

The steering committee votes on strategic and financial issues, and consists of the following members:
 The Prorector of Research of the Heidelberg University
 The Deans of both of the medical faculties for the Heidelberg University
• The Scientific Foundation Board of Directors of the DKFZ
• The Director of the Institute of Mental Health (ZI) Mannheim
• The Director of the Center of Molecular Biology of the Heidelberg University (ZMBH)
• The Director of the NAR

Every two years, the Scientific Advisory Board evaluates the scientific progress of the Network Aging Research. It consists of five members and one should come from the fields of politics, economy, or society. One can become a board member if they have an outstanding scientific competency in the field of aging research or scientific management and do not belong to the NAR or its cooperative partners.

Research Focus 
The Network Aging Research prides itself in being an interdisciplinary institute, supporting researchers in multiple fields of aging, including humanists, natural- and medical scientists.
This form of interdisciplinary research enables new and efficient ways of knowledge transfer between scientists. 
The NAR is focused on:
 Bringing together research in all fields that are represented in the network
 Promotion of young researchers
 Dialogue beyond the borders of disciplines
 Public relations

It is the goal of the NAR to become a leader of interdisciplinary aging research in Germany and Europe.

NAR-Kolleg 
The NAR-Kolleg consists of PhD students, and post doctorates from various disciplines and is funded by the Klaus Tschira Stiftung.

Postgraduate Program “Dementia” 
12 PhD students of various disciplines deal with the topic Dementia. This postgraduate program is supported by the Robert Bosch Stiftung.

History 
The Network Aging Research was established in 2006. Founding director is Prof. Dr. h.c. Konrad Beyreuther. This Network was laid out for permanency and started its work with the opening ceremony in July 2007.

External links 
Homepage of the NAR

2006 establishments in Germany
Gerontology organizations
Heidelberg University
Medical research institutes in Germany
Medical and health organisations based in Baden-Württemberg